Sarracenia naczii is a hybrid of Sarracenia flava and Sarracenia rosea carnivorous plants in the family Sarraceniaceae, described by T. Lawrence Mellichamp.

References 

Mellich., 2008 In: Carniv. Pl. Newslett. 37(4): 113

naczii
Plant nothospecies